Derya Çayırgan (born October 9, 1987 in Istanbul, Turkey) is a Turkish volleyball player.

External links
Player profile at Galatasaray.org
Player profile at Volleybox.net

1995 births
Volleyball players from Istanbul
Living people
Turkish women's volleyball players
Yeşilyurt volleyballers
Galatasaray S.K. (women's volleyball) players
Halkbank volleyball players
Fenerbahçe volleyballers
21st-century Turkish women